USS Flusser (DD-289) was a  built for the United States Navy during World War I.

Description
The Clemson class was a repeat of the preceding  although more fuel capacity was added. They had a crew of 6 officers and 108 enlisted men.

Performance differed radically between the ships of the class, often due to poor workmanship. The Clemson class was powered by two steam turbines, each driving one propeller shaft, using steam provided by four water-tube boilers.

The ships were armed with four 4-inch (102 mm) guns in single mounts and were fitted with two  1-pounder guns for anti-aircraft defense. In many ships a shortage of 1-pounders caused them to be replaced by 3-inch (76 mm) guns. Their primary weapon, though, was their torpedo battery of a dozen 21 inch (533 mm) torpedo tubes in four triple mounts. They also carried a pair of depth charge rails. A "Y-gun" depth charge thrower was added to many ships.

Construction and career
Flusser, named for Charles W. Flusser, was launched 7 November 1919 by Bethlehem Shipbuilding Corporation, Squantum, Massachusetts; sponsored by Mrs. Maude F. Williams; and commissioned 25 February 1920. Flusser'''s first active service was patrol duty in Mexican waters between 9 May 1920 and 17 June, based at Key West. She carried out a comprehensive training schedule along the east coast and in the Caribbean until 18 June 1924 when she sailed from Newport, Rhode Island for a tour of duty with U.S. Naval Forces, Europe, calling at ports in 15 countries before returning to New York 16 July 1925.

Returning to east coast and Caribbean operations, Flusser'' aided in the development of destroyer tactics and carried reservists on training cruises until decommissioned at Philadelphia 1 May 1930. She was scrapped 22 October 1930 in accordance with the terms of the London Treaty limiting naval armaments.

Notes

References

External links

http://www.navsource.org/archives/05/289.htm

 

Clemson-class destroyers
Ships built in Quincy, Massachusetts
1919 ships